Frederick Colin Courtice FAA (26 March 1911, Bundaberg - 29 February 1992, Sydney), was an Australian medical scientist who became an expert in lymphatic physiology.

His father, Frederick Courtice, was a Queensland politician.

Qualifications and recognition
1932 BSc (Hons I), Syd
1932 Rhodes Scholarship (Honours School of Physiology, Oxford)
1934 MA Oxon
1935 DPhil Oxon
1937 LRCP
1937 MRCS
1946 MA Oxon
1946 DSc Syd
1946 Honorary FRACS
1948 Director  of the Kanematsu Memorial Institute of Pathology at Sydney Hospital
1954 Elected FAA
1958-1974 Foundation Professor in the John Curtin School for Medical Research (ANU)
1960 FRACP
1976 Emeritus Professor
Source

References

Fellows of the Australian Academy of Science
Australian medical researchers
1911 births
1992 deaths